Sofia the First is an American computer-animated television series that incorporates characters from the Disney Princess franchise. The series stars Ariel Winter as Sofia, a young girl who becomes a princess when her mother, Miranda, marries King Roland II of the kingdom of Enchancia.

On April 14, 2015, the series was renewed for a fourth season by Disney Junior, which released on April 28, 2017.

The series finale aired on September 8, 2018.

Episodes

Pilot (2012)

Season 1 (2013–14)
Some episodes are directed by Jamie Mitchell.

Season 2 (2014–15)
All episodes in this season are directed by Jamie Mitchell.

Notes:

Season 3 (2015–17)

Notes

Season 4 (2017–18)
All episodes in this season are directed by Jamie Mitchell and Mircea Kyle Mantta.

DJ Melodies (2015)
 "Brave Adventure" – April 4, 2015
 "The More the Merrier" – April 9, 2015

References

Sofia the First
Lists of Disney Channel television series episodes
Episodes